Leigh-on-Mendip or Leigh upon Mendip (on Ordnance Survey maps) is a small village on the Mendip Hills in Somerset, England.

The village has several sporting clubs, including cricket, shortmat bowls and table tennis. There is a First School.

History

The name of this village is pronounced lye or lie by local residents rather than lee, and probably comes from the Old English meaning grove or glade.

The estate formed part of the manor and liberty of Mells and was held by Glastonbury Abbey from Saxon times until the dissolution of the monasteries. It then passed to the Horner family. The parish was part of the hundred of Frome.

On 19 June 1643 the village was the site of a skirmish in the English Civil War, between Royalist regiment of Sir James Hamilton and the parliamentary forces under Major Francis Duett.

Some dwellings in Leigh on Mendip parish are close to the Halecombe limestone quarry. The quarry exhibits pale to dark grey well-bedded Carboniferous Limestone. There are abundant near-vertical fissures and joints in the limestone with varying amounts of calcite mineralization and tufa growth around groundwater seepages. Quarrying activity was initiated at the time of the Second World War. It is now owned by Anglo American.

A "History of Leigh on Mendip" was web published in February 2007. In 2007 Leigh on Mendip was chosen as the Calor Somerset Village of the Year.

Leigh on Mendip was home to the television presenter Kevin McCloud, who is known best from the UK television series; Grand Designs.

Governance

The parish council has responsibility for local issues, including setting an annual precept (local rate) to cover the council's operating costs and producing annual accounts for public scrutiny. The parish council evaluates local planning applications and works with the local police, district council officers, and neighbourhood watch groups on matters of crime, security, and traffic. The parish council's role also includes initiating projects for the maintenance and repair of parish facilities, as well as consulting with the district council on the maintenance, repair, and improvement of highways, drainage, footpaths, public transport, and street cleaning. Conservation matters (including trees and listed buildings) and environmental issues are also the responsibility of the council.

The village falls within the Non-metropolitan district of Mendip, which was formed on 1 April 1974 under the Local Government Act 1972, having previously been part of Frome Rural District, which is responsible for local planning and building control, local roads, council housing, environmental health, markets and fairs, refuse collection and recycling, cemeteries and crematoria, leisure services, parks, and tourism.

Somerset County Council is responsible for running the largest and most expensive local services such as education, social services, libraries, main roads, public transport, policing and fire services, trading standards, waste disposal and strategic planning.

It is also part of the Somerton and Frome county constituency represented in the House of Commons of the Parliament of the United Kingdom. It elects one Member of Parliament (MP) by the first past the post system of election.

Religious sites

The parish Church of St Giles dates from around 1350, and was rebuilt around 1500.
It is a Grade 1 listed building, with an unusual faceless clock.

There used to be a Methodist chapel in the village, however this is now a private house.

References

External links
 Village website
  Map of Leigh upon Mendip circa 1900

Mendip Hills
Villages in Mendip District
Civil parishes in Somerset